Cohors [prima] Aurelia Antonina Hemesenorum milliaria [peditata] ("[1st infantry 1000 strong] Aurelian and Antonine cohort of Hemesii?") was a Roman auxiliary infantry regiment. The cohort was stationed in Dacia at castra Micia.

See also 
 Roman auxiliaries
 List of Roman auxiliary regiments

Sources
Ovidiu Ţentea. 2012. Ex Oriente ad Danubium : the Syrian units on the Danube frontier of the Roman Empire. Bucharest: Mega.

References

Military of ancient Rome
Auxiliary peditata units of ancient Rome
Roman Dacia